Chadwick Chandler Tromp (born March 21, 1995) is an Aruban professional baseball catcher for the Atlanta Braves of Major League Baseball (MLB). In 2013 he signed with the Cincinnati Reds organization as an international free agent. He made his MLB debut in 2020 with the San Francisco Giants.

Career

Cincinnati Reds
On May 24, 2013, Tromp signed with the Cincinnati Reds organization as an international free agent. He was assigned to the AZL Reds, where he spent the season. In 2014, Tromp spent time between the AZL Reds and the Single-A Dayton Dragons. He batted .311/.345/.472 with three home runs and 13 RBIs in 106 at bats.

In 2015, Tromp played for Dayton and a game for the Triple-A Louisville Bats. In 2016, Tromp played the entire season for the advanced Single-A Daytona Tortugas. 

Tromp spent 2017 with Daytona and the Double-A Pensacola Blue Wahoos. He was invited to Spring Training for the 2018 season, but did not make the club and played in 25 games for Pensacola and 53 for Triple-A Louisville on the year. 

In 2019, he spent time with the AZL Reds and Louisville. He batted .280/.397/.568 with nine home runs and 37 RBIs in 125 at bats. He elected free agency on November 4, 2019.

San Francisco Giants
On January 6, 2020, Tromp signed a minor league contract with the San Francisco Giants organization. 

On July 28, 2020, the Giants called him up to MLB for the first time. Tromp made his MLB debut on July 29 against the San Diego Padres and went hitless over four at bats. Tromp hit his first home run in the majors on August 2, in a 9-5 loss to the Texas Rangers. On December 2, Tromp was nontendered by the Giants. On December 9, Tromp re-signed with the Giants on a major league contract. On September 18, 2021, Tromp was designated for assignment by the Giants after hitting .222 during 18 plate appearances.

Atlanta Braves
On September 21, 2021, the Atlanta Braves claimed Tromp off waivers from San Francisco, and optioned him to the Triple-A Gwinnett Stripers. On April 12, 2022, Tromp was designated for assignment by the Braves. He cleared waivers and was outrighted to Triple-A Gwinnett Stripers on April 19, 2022.

On August 6, 2022, Tromp was called up to Atlanta as a backup catcher, following an injury to Travis d'Arnaud.

On August 13, 2022, Tromp had a three-hit, three RBI performance in his first game started for the Braves against the Miami Marlins.

International career
Tromp was selected for the Netherlands national baseball team for the 2016 European Baseball Championship, the training camp in the United States in 2017, the 2017 World Baseball Classic and the 2019 WBSC Premier12.

On September 7, he was selected for the 2016 European Baseball Championship.

On February 7, 2017, he was selected for the training camp in the United States. On March 20, 2017, he was selected for the 2017 World Baseball Classic after Didi Gregorius was injured.

On October 14, 2019, he was selected for the 2019 WBSC Premier12.

References

External links

1995 births
Living people
Arizona League Reds players
Aruban expatriate baseball players in the United States
Atlanta Braves players
Dayton Dragons players
Daytona Tortugas players
Louisville Bats players
Major League Baseball catchers
Major League Baseball players from Aruba
National baseball team players
Pensacola Blue Wahoos players
People from Oranjestad, Aruba
San Francisco Giants players
Scottsdale Scorpions players
2016 European Baseball Championship players
2017 World Baseball Classic players
2019 WBSC Premier12 players
2023 World Baseball Classic players
Aruban expatriate baseball players in the Dominican Republic
Estrellas Orientales players